James A. Barlow Jr. (September 4, 1923 – January 2, 2015) was an American geologist and politician.

Born in Englewood, New Jersey, he served in the United States Navy during World War II. He received his bachelor's degree from Middlebury College and his master's and doctorate degrees from University of Wyoming. He worked for several oil companies and then had his own business. From 1960 to 1966, Barlow served on the Casper, Wyoming city council and then was the mayor from 1966 to 1968. From 1983 to 1987, Barlow served in the Wyoming House of Representatives as a Republican. He died in Jackson Hole, Wyoming.

Notes

1923 births
2015 deaths
People from Englewood, New Jersey
Politicians from Casper, Wyoming
Middlebury College alumni
University of Wyoming alumni
American geologists
Wyoming city council members
Mayors of places in Wyoming
Republican Party members of the Wyoming House of Representatives
United States Navy personnel of World War II